The 2019 Kulgam massacre refers to the killing of seven Bengali Muslim labourers in the Kulgam district of Jammu and Kashmir, India by foreign-based terrorists. The attack was carried out by members of Hizbul Mujahideen, after being planned by Hizbul Mujahideen commander Ajaz Malik.

Background

Attack
The 2019 Kulgam massacre occurred when terrorists entered a home housing Bengali Muslim labourers in the union territory of Jammu and Kashmir. These men came to Kulgam to work in the apple orchards there. The terrorists, who are suspected of being Kashmiri separatists, lined up the men and killed seven of them. One of them named Baharaduddin, survived after being left for dead.

Victims 
Sheikh Rafiq (murdered) 
Naimuddin Alam (murdered)
Qamaruddin Sheikh (murdered)
Mursalim Sheikh (murdered)
Rafiqul Alam (murdered)
Baharaduddin (injured)

Consequences 
The chief minister of West Bengal, Mamata Banerjee, identified 130 labourers still working in Jammu and Kashmir and is supporting their return to their home state for safety reasons, although some of them are opting to remain in the union territory. The bodies of the victims were returned to their families by the Ministry of Home Affairs.

References 

2019 murders in India
October 2019 crimes in Asia
Islamic terrorist incidents in 2019
Kashmir conflict
Mass murder in 2019
Terrorist incidents in India in 2019
2010s in Jammu and Kashmir